Four-pointer may refer to:

 Four-point play, a rare play in basketball 
 Four-point field goal, a long shot in games featuring the Harlem Globetrotters or in the BIG3 basketball league
 Six-pointer, an association football cliché that is used in leagues that employ a "three points for a win" system to describe a game between two teams with similar league positions